Jerry Lee Lewis is the 35th studio album by American rock and roll pioneer Jerry Lee Lewis, released by Elektra in 1979.

Recording
After 15 years with Mercury, Lewis made the switch to Elektra in 1978, and the move seemed to rejuvenate him.  He had grown tired with the formulaic overproduction that his recent albums on Mercury had been layered with and began recording new material with producer Bones Howe in January 1979 in Los Angeles. Howe, who had worked on Elvis Presley's celebrated 1968 comeback special and had produced albums by Tom Waits and Juice Newton, assembled a more stripped-down band (including Elvis's former guitarist James Burton) that resembled what Lewis used on the road. The resulting album was the best Lewis had made in years. The single "Rockin' My Life Away," would only make it to number 18 on the country charts but would become a live favorite and another in a growing list of songs that were written specifically to celebrate Jerry Lee's uncompromising rock and roll attitude. Another impressive track was "Who Will The Next Fool Be," a gin-soaked Charlie Rich tune that Lewis confidently makes his own ("Pick it, James," he oozes to Burton on the instrumental bonephone break, before rasping, "Play your fiddle, Mr. Lovelace," to long-time band member Ken Lovelace). Sonny Throckmorton, who had written Lewis's last big hit "Middle Age Crazy," mines similar territory on "I Wish I was Eighteen Again," and Lewis also gives spirited performances on Arthur Alexander's "Every Day I Have To Cry" and "Rita Mae," marking the first time he'd ever recorded a song written by Bob Dylan.

This was a tumultuous time for Lewis, whose father Elmo was ailing and would die later that year. Lewis himself had been hospitalized several times for stomach ailments brought about by his pills and carousing, and in the spring of 1979 he was countersued for divorce by his wife Jaren Pate, who accused him of years of cruelty and drunkenness. The IRS was also after him for unpaid taxes.

Reception

Jerry Lee Lewis was acclaimed critically but was not a commercial success, peaking at number 23 on the Billboard country albums chart and limping to number 186 on the Top 200. Writing in the liner notes to the 2006 career retrospective A Half Century of Hits, country music historian Colin Escott calls the album "an astonishing return to form," likening Lewis's performance on "Who Will The Next Fool Be" to "a poisoned dart hurled at every woman who had done him wrong."  In his authorized biography Jerry Lee Lewis: His Own Story, Rick Bragg also praises the album: "While his voice was showing its scars and the words were frequently obscure, Jerry Lee delivered them with commitment, and the beat was pure Louisiana boogie-woogie."

Track listing
"Don't Let Go" (Jesse Stone)
"Rita May" (Bob Dylan, Jacques Levy)
"Every Day I Have to Cry" (Arthur Alexander)
"I Like It Like That" (Allen Toussaint, Chris Kenner)
"Number One Lovin' Man" (Jim Cottengim)
"Rockin' My Life Away" (Mack Vickery)
"Who Will the Next Fool Be" (Charlie Rich)
"(You've Got) Personality" (Harold Logan, Lloyd Price)
"I Wish I Was Eighteen Again" (Sonny Throckmorton)
"Rocking Little Angel" (Jimmie Rogers)

Personnel
Jerry Lee Lewis - vocals, piano
James Burton - electric guitar, dobro
Kenny Lovelace - acoustic & electric guitar, violin
Tim May - acoustic & electric guitar
Dave Parlato - bass
Hal Blaine - drums, percussion
Ron Hicklin Singers - backing vocals
Bob Alcivar - string arrangements, conductor

References

Jerry Lee Lewis albums
1979 albums
Albums produced by Bones Howe
Elektra Records albums